Eulima legrandi is a species of sea snail, a marine gastropod mollusk in the family Eulimidae. The species is one of a number within the genus Eulima.

Distribution
This marine species is endemic to Australia and occurs off Tasmania.

References

 Beddome, C.E. 1883. Description of some new marine shells of Tasmania. Papers and Proceedings of the Royal Society of Tasmania 1882: 167-170

External links
 To World Register of Marine Species

legrandi
Gastropods described in 1883
Gastropods of Australia